William Clerk may refer to:

William Clerk (administrator), clerk to the Privy Chamber of Henry VIII of England
William Clerk (jurist) (died 1655)
William Clerk (MP died 1415) for Weymouth and Melcombe Regis
William Clerk (MP for Wycombe) (fl.1399-1420), MP and mayor
William Clerk (MP for Calne), in 1415, MP for Calne
William Clerk (MP for Northampton), in 1417, MP for Northampton

See also
William the Clerk
William Clerke (disambiguation)
William Clark (disambiguation)